Hypogastric plexus may refer to:
 Superior hypogastric plexus
 Inferior hypogastric plexus